Shimmer is New York City's Bitter Grace's long-awaited follow up to God and the Abyss.  While Shimmer did not take as long to release, seven years to the twelve it took to finish the previous, the band still underwent line-up changes through the period of recording and releasing this album, however not as severely.  Both bassists recorded on this album have left the band, though one of the guitarists that has been recorded here eventually returned in late 2005 just prior to its release after a hiatus.

The difference in sound between God and the Abyss and Shimmer is striking, with the new direction of the band adding more elements of electronic dance music and a generally dancier sound.  Keyboards are more prominent than before and the sound is less garage-centric and more melodic.

The album itself is not released yet.  Some tracks have been available for a while online and two initial singles, "Shimmering" and "Slave", have been receiving college and Internet radio airplay.  Shimmer tells a modern-day gothic fairy tale about "the very clever boy, who was really never quite that clever" and the tracks themselves lead the story along.

Track listing
All songs by Gustavo Lapis Ahumad except: "Viva Las Vegas"; "Slave" & "Shimmering" by Brandon Tubby and Bitter Grace; "On Their Lips" by Caitlyn Deery and Bitter Grace.
 "Really Something"
 "Deep Deep"
 "Viva Las Vegas"
 "Anyway"
 "Slave"
 "Shimmering"
 "End of Days"
 "On Their Lips"
 "Love is You"
 "End of Days" (Good Bye Mix)

Personnel
 Gustavo Lapis Ahumad - Lyrics / Vocals / Producer
 Brandon Tubby - Guitars
 Christopher Clarke - Bass / Guitars
 Avi Berkovich - Drums
 Marcus Pan - Album Graphics
 Esther - Bass
 George Grant - Engineer

References 

2005 albums
Bitter Grace albums